The Europe/Africa Zone was one of three zones of regional competition in the 2012 Fed Cup.

Group I
Venue: Municipal Tennis Club, Eilat, Israel (hard, outdoors)
Date: 1–4 February

The fifteen teams were divided into three pools of four teams and one pool of three. The four pool winners took part in play-offs to determine the two nations advancing to the World Group II Play-offs. The nations finishing last in their pools took part in play-offs, with the two losing nations relegated to Group II for 2013.

Pools

Play-offs

 and  advanced to World Group II play-offs.

Group II
Venue: Golf El Solaimaneyah Club, Cairo, Egypt (clay, outdoors)
Date: Week of 16 April (ties played 18–21 April)

The eight teams were divided into two pools of four. The top nation from each pool played off against the runner-up from the other with the two winning teams promoted to the Europe/Africa Zone Group I for 2013. Third-placed nations played-off against fourth placing nations with the losing teams facing relegation to the Europe/Africa Zone Group III for 2013.

Pools

Play-offs

 and  promoted to Europe/Africa World Group I in 2013.

Group III
Venue: Golf El Solaimaneyah Club, Cairo, Egypt (clay, outdoors)
Date: Week of 16 April (ties played 16–21 April)

The eleven teams were divided into one pool of five teams and one pool of six. The top nation from each pool played off against the runner-up from the other with the two winning teams promoted to the Europe/Africa Zone Group II for 2013.

Pools

Play-offs

 and  promoted to Europe/Africa Zone Group II in 2012.

See also
Fed Cup structure

External links
 Fed Cup website

 
Europe Africa